Arjola Trimi (born 15 March 1987) is an Italian Paralympic swimmer competing in S4 classification events. She competed at the 2016 Summer Paralympics, and 2020 Summer Paralympics, in Women's 4 × 50 mixed freestyle relay, winning a silver medal.

She made her major international debut at the 2013 IPC Swimming World Championships in Montreal, where she won four medals. A year later she became European champion in her classification in the 50m, 100m and 200m freestyle events. In 2015, she won her first World gold taking the 50m backstroke title at the World Games in Glasgow.

Personal history
Trimi was born in Tirana, Albania, her family is Albanian. She has an acquired form of degenerative muscular condition which has resulted in quadriplegia and muscle contractions.

Swimming career
Trimi learnt to swim as a baby, but always saw it as a hobby that helped her relax. She took part in several sports, such as wheelchair basketball and athletics, but it was not until her medical condition worsened that she turned to swimming as a competitive event. She took up swimming competitively in 2013 and was initially classified as a S5 athlete; but was reclassified soon after as S4. That same year she was chosen to represent Italy at the 2013 IPC Swimming World Championships in Montreal. There she won four medals: silvers in the 50m freestyle and the 50m 4x50 freestyle relay, and bronze in both the 100m and 200m freestyle S4 races.

In 2014, she won her first senior international gold medals, becoming European champion in the 50m, 100m and 200m freestyle events at the 2014 IPC Swimming European Championships in Eindhoven. A year later she was back in the Italian squad, this time in the World Championships in Glasgow. Trimi won two medals, a silver in the 50m Freestyle and gold in the 50m backstroke, making her World champion in the event.

See also
Italy at the 2016 Summer Paralympics
Italy at the 2020 Summer Paralympics

References

External links
 

1987 births
Living people
Italian female breaststroke swimmers
Italian female freestyle swimmers
Italian female backstroke swimmers
Italian female medley swimmers
Swimmers from Milan
S4-classified Paralympic swimmers
Paralympic gold medalists for Italy
Paralympic silver medalists for Italy
Paralympic swimmers of Italy
Swimmers at the 2016 Summer Paralympics
Swimmers at the 2020 Summer Paralympics
Medalists at the 2016 Summer Paralympics
Medalists at the 2020 Summer Paralympics
Medalists at the World Para Swimming Championships
Medalists at the World Para Swimming European Championships
Paralympic medalists in swimming
Italian people of Albanian descent